USS Oahu (ARG-5) was a Luzon-class internal combustion engine repair ship that saw service in the United States Navy during World War II. Named for the Island of Oahu, third largest island in the Hawaiian chain, it was the second US Naval vessel to bear the name.

Construction
Oahu was laid down 14 August 1943, as the liberty ship SS Caleb C. Wheeler, under a Maritime Commission (MARCOM) contract, MCE hull 1782,  by the Bethlehem-Fairfield Shipyard, Inc., in Baltimore, Maryland; launched 9 September 1943; sponsored by Mrs. O. F. Hurt; acquired by the Navy from MARCOM 15 September 1943; converted by the Maryland Drydock Company, Baltimore, Maryland; and commissioned 4 April 1944.

Service history 
Following a Chesapeake Bay shakedown, the repair ship Oahu departed Hampton Roads, Virginia, 16 May 1944, steaming south and then west. Transiting the Panama Canal, she headed out into the Pacific. On 8 July, she arrived at Eniwetok and on 11 July, began repairing the damaged vessels of the Pacific Fleet. 
 
Oahu remained based at Eniwetok for the greater part of the next eight months. There she kept Allied vessels, naval and merchant, in trim and prepared them for the Philippine and Iwo Jima operations. Moving forward to Ulithi at the end of February 1945, she serviced the ships gathering for the invasion of Okinawa during March and then returned to the Marshalls. Oahu continued her work at Eniwetok until 6 December, when she got underway for the United States.

Decommissioning and post-war 
Arriving at San Pedro, California, 25 December, Oahu, having repaired over two thousand ships during the war, was ordered to San Diego, California, to complete repair and pre-inactivation work on vessels going into mothballs.

On 22 November she herself was ordered inactivated, and decommissioned in January 1947. She was berthed at San Diego as a unit of the Pacific Reserve Fleet until transferred 13 March 1962, and laid up at Suisun Bay. On 1 July 1963, she was permanently transferred to the Maritime Administration (MARAD). She remained there as a unit of the National Defense Reserve Fleet until being sold to General Metals of Tacoma, Inc., on 27 March 1978. She was withdrawn 7 June 1978, for scrapping.

Awards 
Oahu received one battle star for World War II service.

Notes

Bibliography

Online resources

External links
 Ships of the U.S. Navy, 1940-1945 AR - Repair Ships
 Liberty Ships built by the United States Maritime Commission in World War II 
 HyperWar: Beans, Bullet and Black Oil (Appendix)
 Photo gallery at navsource.org

 

Luzon-class repair ships
Ships built in Baltimore
1943 ships
World War II auxiliary ships of the United States